Angels in the Outfield is a 1951 American comedy film produced and directed by Clarence Brown and starring Paul Douglas and Janet Leigh. Based on a story by Richard Conlin, the film is about a young woman reporter who blames the Pittsburgh Pirates' losing streak on their abusive manager, who begins hearing the voice of an angel promising to help the team if he changes his ways. The film was released by Metro-Goldwyn-Mayer on September 7, 1951.

Richard Conlin was the pseudonym of Father Richard F. Grady, S.J. (1905-1989), who was Chair of the English Department and Dean of the Evening School at the University of Scranton in Scranton, Pennsylvania, USA.

Plot
With baseball's Pittsburgh Pirates in last place, their combative, foul-mouthed manager Guffy McGovern has plenty to complain about. His abusive language toward players is publicized by local newspaper reporter and former "household hints" writer Jennifer Paige, who is thoroughly unimpressed with his style of management.

Guffy's fortune changes while wandering through Forbes Field in search of his good luck charm one night, where he is accosted by the voice of an angel, who hints at having been a ballplayer during his earthly life. As the spokes-angel for the Heavenly Choir Nine, a celestial team of deceased ballplayers, he begins bestowing "miracles" upon the Pirates—but only on the condition that Guffy put a moratorium on swearing and fighting. He acquiesces and, with the help of the invisible ghosts of past baseball greats, the Pirates make it into the pennant race.

During a game, 8-year-old orphan Bridget White insists she can see the angels helping out the "live" ballplayers—understandably so, since it was Bridget's prayers to the Archangel Gabriel which prompted the angel to visit McGovern in the first place. Jennifer inadvertently transforms Bridget's angelic visions into a nationwide news story, causing McGovern no end of trouble.

After a line drive hits him in the head during a game, Guffy himself deliriously confirms Bridget's claims to the press. He falls into the hands of vengeful sportscaster Fred Bayles, who has been scheming to have Guffy thrown out of baseball and persuades the Commissioner of Baseball to investigate the manager's fitness to lead the team.

Complication piles upon complication until the pennant-deciding game, wherein Guffy is forced to rely exclusively upon the talents of his ballplayersnotably "over the hill" pitcher Saul Hellman, who the angel declares will be "signed up" by the Heavenly Choir team shortly. Guffy also wins over Jennifer, and they plan to adopt young Bridget.

Cast
 Paul Douglas as Guffy McGovern
 Janet Leigh as Jennifer Paige
 Keenan Wynn as Fred Bayles
 Lewis Stone as Arnold P. Hapgood
 Spring Byington as Sister Edwitha
 Bruce Bennett as Saul Hellman
 Marvin Kaplan as Timothy Durney
 Ellen Corby as Sister Veronica
 Donna Corcoran as Bridget White
 Jeff Richards as Dave Rothberg
 John Gallaudet as Reynolds
 King Donovan as McGee
 Don Haggerty as Rube Ronson
 Paul Salata as Tony Minelli
 Fred Graham as "Chunk"
 James Whitmore as Angel (voice)
 Judy Nugent as Margaret (uncredited)

In addition, short cameos by people playing themselves are "interviewed" regarding the angels: Bing Crosby, at that time a part-owner (approximately 15%) of the Pirates; retired baseball Hall of Famer Ty Cobb; active player (later a Hall of Famer) Joe DiMaggio; and Hollywood songwriter Harry Ruby.

Uncredited members of the real Pittsburgh Pirates, at that time, include Ralph Kiner (hitting a home run and playing first base), George Strickland, Ed Fitz Gerald and George Metkovich, as well as coaches Sam Narron and Lenny Levy.

Production

Development 
MGM originally purchased the story as a vehicle for Spencer Tracy, who was later replaced by Clark Gable. When Gable chose instead to make Lone Star, MGM attempted unsuccessfully to borrow James Cagney from Warner Brothers before settling on Paul Douglas. Two years earlier Douglas had played a catcher in another baseball comedy film, It Happens Every Spring. Although he had no background in baseball, Bruce Bennett (billed earlier in his career as "Herman Brix"), who portrays a veteran Pittsburgh pitcher, in real life had played football in the 1926 Rose Bowl and won a silver medal in the shot put at the 1928 Summer Olympics.

Casting 
Three athletes, two former and one then-active, have credited roles in the film: Jeff Richards, who appears as Rothberg, had been a minor-league baseball player before becoming an actor; Fred Graham, who appears as "Chunk", had been a semi-pro ballplayer; and Paul Salata, who appears as Tony Minelli, played professional football from 1949 to 1953.

Locations
The film contains extensive baseball action shots, most of which were filmed at Forbes Field, the former home of the Pittsburgh Pirates and Steelers, demolished in 1971, the year after the Pirates and Steelers moved to Three Rivers Stadium. The opening credits acknowledge "the kind cooperation of the Pittsburgh 'Pirates' for the use of the team and its ballpark", while reminding the viewer that the story is fictional and "could be any baseball team, in any league, in any town in America".

Historians may note several distinguishing features of Forbes Field at the time. One is the "Kiner's Korner" inner fence in left field, with the 365-feet left field foul line marker observable on the outer wall, and the 335-feet sign on the inner fence. The other distance markers (376-457-436-375-300) are visible in some scenes. Other objects on the field of play at Forbes are visible from time to time, including the flagpole and batting cage near the 457 foot marker in deep left center field, and the Barney Dreyfuss monument in straightaway center field. The University of Pittsburgh's Cathedral of Learning is prominent in many shots filmed in Forbes Field.

A few scenes were shot on location at Wrigley Field, conveniently sited in South Los Angeles. Well-used by film-makers of the era, the ballpark — home to the minor league Angels from 1925 to 1957 — was named for team owner William Wrigley, Jr. when the landmark Chicago stadium was still known as Cubs Park. While Wrigley's ivy-covered outfield wall stands in nicely for that of Forbes Field, "Kiner's Korner" is conspicuous in its absence, and visible distance markers (412 feet in centre field; 345 feet in left) are inconsistent with Forbes Field's grander dimensions.

Some stock footage alleged to be the Polo Grounds in New York City was actually Comiskey Park in Chicago, as evidenced by a quick glimpse of an auxiliary scoreboard reading "Visitors" and "White Sox".

Filming 
Since the Hays Code prohibited most profanity in films at the time, the "swearing" uttered by Guffy is audio gibberish, which was made by scrambling recordings of actor Paul Douglas's voice.

The angels themselves are never actually seen by the viewing audience, just the effects of their presence — a feather dropping, or someone being jostled from time to time. The angel who talks to Guffy never reveals who he was in life. However, this angel does reveal his presence to Bayles: when Bayles sarcastically asks "the little angels up there" if they are happy with the Pirates' win over the New York Giants, Bayles hears the angel reply "Oh, why don't you just shut up?" and the angel pulls Bayles' hat down over Bayles' face. Bayles looks up incredulously upon hearing the voice, searching for the speaker.

Release 
The film held its world premiere at Pittsburgh's Loew's Penn Theatre on its release day.

Critical appraisal
On review aggregation website Rotten Tomatoes, the film has an 83% approval rating based on 6 reviews, with an average rating of 7/10.

Box office
According to MGM records the film made $1,466,000 in the US and Canada and $200,000 elsewhere. Once studio overhead was added, the film recorded a net loss of $171,000.

See also
 Angels in the Outfield, 1994 film
 List of films about angels

References

Further reading
 Associated Press. "Pirates Trying for Title May Receive Oscar". The Gettysburg Times. March 22, 1951.
 Danver, Charles. "Pittsburghesque: Movie Triumph". Pittsburgh Post-Gazette. July 2, 1951.
 Fortune, Dick. "Backstage Beat: 'Angels' Premiere Sept. 7'". The Pittsburgh Press. August 15, 1951.

External links
 
 
 
 

1951 films
1950s fantasy comedy films
American baseball films
American fantasy comedy films
American sports comedy films
American black-and-white films
Films about angels
Films directed by Clarence Brown
Films scored by Daniele Amfitheatrof
Films set in Pittsburgh
Films shot in Pennsylvania
Films with screenplays by George Wells
Metro-Goldwyn-Mayer films
Pittsburgh Pirates
Religious sports films
1950s sports comedy films
1951 comedy films
1950s English-language films
1950s American films